In mathematics, Hadamard's lemma, named after Jacques Hadamard, is essentially a first-order form of Taylor's theorem, in which we can express a smooth, real-valued function exactly in a convenient manner.

Statement

Proof

Consequences and applications

See also

Citations

References 

 
  

Real analysis
Theorems in analysis